In Deep Waters is a Canadian-French co-produced animated film, directed by Sarah Van Den Boom and released in 2014. An exploration of vanishing twin pregnancies, the film depicts three characters whose lives have been profoundly impacted by having had twin siblings who died in utero.

The film's voice cast included Fred Bianconi, Denis Michaud, Béatrice Picard and Mathilde Van den Boom in the French version, and Julian Casey, Miranda Handford, Joanna Noyes and Richard Jutras in the English version.

The film was a Canadian Screen Award nominee for Best Animated Short Film at the 4th Canadian Screen Awards.

The film was one of the first short films selected for the National Film Board of Canada's new subscription video on demand service in 2016.

References

External links 
 
 In Deep Waters at the National Film Board of Canada

2014 films
National Film Board of Canada animated short films
Films produced by Julie Roy
2014 animated films
Canadian animated short films
French animated short films
2010s Canadian films
2010s French films